Ruth Brooks Flippen (born Ruth Albertina Brooks; September 14, 1921 – July 9, 1981) was an American screenwriter and television writer.

Life and career
Born Ruth Albertina Brooks on September 14, 1921, in Brooklyn, Flippen was married to character actor Jay C. Flippen on January 4, 1947. The marriage lasted until Jay Flippen's death on February 3, 1971. Ruth Brooks Flippen died on July 9, 1981, in Marina del Rey, California.

Flippen wrote a number of films in the 1950s and early 1960s, including some of the Gidget films, then moved to television where she wrote extensively for the series That Girl and other productions. She was nominated for a 1968 Emmy Award in the category "Outstanding Writing Achievement in Comedy" for the That Girl episode "The Mailman Cometh" and a 1975 Daytime Emmy Award in the category "Outstanding Writing for a Daytime Special Program" for Oh, Baby, Baby, Baby..., a 90-minute drama aired under the aegis of The ABC Afternoon Playbreak.

Flippen was briefly head writer (in 1980) of the soap opera Days of Our Lives

Writing, editing, and consulting credits

Motion pictures
Three Guys Named Mike (1951)
Love Is Better Than Ever (1952)
Because You're Mine (1952)
Everything I Have Is Yours (film) (1952)
I Love Melvin (1953; "additional dialogue" credit)
Gidget Goes Hawaiian (1961)
Sail a Crooked Ship (1961)
Gidget Goes to Rome (1963)
A Ticklish Affair (1963)
Looking for Love (1964)

Television
Gidget (1965-1966; 8 episodes)
Bewitched (1965-1971; 38 episodes)
That Girl (1967-1969; 55 episodes)
The Brady Bunch (1969-1970; 16 episodes)
My World and Welcome to It (1969-1970; 2 episodes)
The Odd Couple (1970; 1 episode)
The Ghost & Mrs. Muir (1970; 1 episode)
The New Scooby-Doo Movies (1972; 16 episodes)
The ABC Saturday Superstar Movie (1972; 4 episodes)
Oh, Baby, Baby, Baby... (1974; 90-minute drama)
Let's Switch (1975; TV movie)
The Love Boat (1980-1981; 2 episodes)

References

1921 births
1981 deaths
Writers from Brooklyn
American television writers
American women screenwriters
American women television writers
20th-century American women writers
Women soap opera writers
Screenwriters from New York (state)
20th-century American screenwriters